Nuno Fernando Gonçalves da Rocha (born 21 February 1972), known as Capucho, is a Portuguese former professional footballer who played as a winger, currently a manager.

Blessed with both scoring and dribbling ability alike, he also displayed good defensive and tackling skills. His 15-year professional career was mainly associated with Porto (although he also represented Sporting CP), with which he won a total of 13 major titles, having appeared in 368 Primeira Liga games over 13 seasons, scoring 59 goals.

For Portugal, Capucho appeared in one World Cup and one European Championship, both in the early 2000s.

Club career
Capucho was born in Barcelos. After starting with his hometown's Gil Vicente F.C. he moved to Sporting CP, where he would be relatively used during his three-year spell, helping the Lisbon team to the 1995 Taça de Portugal.

After two seasons with Guimarães' Vitória SC, Capucho joined FC Porto, being a major part of a side that won three Primeira Liga titles and the 2002–03 UEFA Cup, starting in the final against Celtic. His worst domestic output came precisely that season, scoring four goals in 27 matches as the northerners won the treble.

Capucho would leave Porto prior to the conquest of the UEFA Champions League, having appeared in nearly 250 official games with the club. He retired in 2005 at the age of 32, after one-year spells with Scotland's Rangers and RC Celta de Vigo of the Spanish Segunda División.

International career
With 34 caps for Portugal, Capucho played more defensively for the nation than while at Porto, appearing at UEFA Euro 2000 (two late substitute appearances and a start against Germany, when Portugal was already qualified) and the 2002 FIFA World Cup (replacing Sérgio Conceição in the 4–0 thrashing of Poland). After Luiz Felipe Scolari took over as national team boss in early 2003, he was never called again.

In 1991, Capucho only missed one game as the under-20s (which also included Rui Costa, Luís Figo and João Pinto) won the FIFA World Cup, played on home soil.

Coaching career
Capucho returned to Porto in the summer of 2007, being charged with training its junior sides for several years. His first job at the professional level occurred in 2015–16, when he led newly promoted Varzim S.C. to the ninth place (from 24 teams) in the Segunda Liga. He subsequently moved to the top flight with neighbours Rio Ave FC, being fired on 10 November 2016 due to poor results.

In October 2017, Capucho returned to Varzim. He left in December of the following year, by mutual consent.

On 8 April 2019, Capucho was appointed at C.D. Mafra who were eighth in the second division following a run of nine games without a win that cost the job of Filipe Pedro. He won one and drew two of their five remaining matches, then chose to part ways.

Capucho succeeded Daúto Faquirá at S.C. Covilhã on 25 September 2020, after they lost their first three games of the new season. He left the following 9 February, with the team three points above the relegation zone despite a fixture backlog; he had started with a seven-game unbeaten run and concluded with an eight-game winless streak.

Career statistics

Club

|}

Honours
Sporting CP
Taça de Portugal: 1994–95

Porto
Primeira Liga: 1997–98, 1998–99, 2002–03
Taça de Portugal: 1997–98, 1999–2000, 2000–01, 2002–03
Supertaça Cândido de Oliveira: 1997, 1998, 1999, 2000, 2001
UEFA Cup: 2002–03

Portugal U20
FIFA U-20 World Cup: 1991

References

External links

1972 births
Living people
People from Barcelos, Portugal
Sportspeople from Braga District
Portuguese footballers
Association football wingers
Primeira Liga players
Liga Portugal 2 players
Gil Vicente F.C. players
Sporting CP footballers
Vitória S.C. players
FC Porto players
Scottish Premier League players
Rangers F.C. players
Segunda División players
RC Celta de Vigo players
UEFA Cup winning players
Portugal youth international footballers
Portugal under-21 international footballers
Portugal international footballers
UEFA Euro 2000 players
2002 FIFA World Cup players
Olympic footballers of Portugal
Footballers at the 1996 Summer Olympics
Portuguese expatriate footballers
Expatriate footballers in Scotland
Expatriate footballers in Spain
Portuguese expatriate sportspeople in Scotland
Portuguese expatriate sportspeople in Spain
Portuguese football managers
Primeira Liga managers
Liga Portugal 2 managers
Varzim S.C. managers
Rio Ave F.C. managers
S.C. Covilhã managers